Isabell Lehn Herlovsen (born 23 June 1988) is a Norwegian former football player.

She last played for Våleranga and Kolbotn after moving home from China and the club Jiangsu Suning. She plays as a midfielder and a striker.

Herlovsen is the daughter of former football player Kai Erik Herlovsen and was born in Germany during his spell at Borussia Mönchengladbach. She is a Norwegian women's international having made her debut at the age of 16. Herlovsen was the youngest player at UEFA Women's Euro 2005 and became the youngest goal-scorer in the tournament's history on 9 June 2005 when she scored a goal in a 1–1 draw against France.

Club career
Herlovsen began her career at Kolbotn IL. She made her debut with the club in 2004 and played for five seasons winning two league titles in 2005 and 2006 and winning the women's national cup in 2007. Following the UEFA Women's Euro 2005, Herlovsen drew interest from the women's section of English club Arsenal. The two sides met for negotiations, but were unable to reach an agreement. Later on, Herlovsen scored for her club Kolbotn in the 2007 edition of the women's Norwegian Cup. The players received their championship medals from the King of Norway.

On 28 October 2009, Herlovsen's parent club Kolbotn announced that the player, alongside club and national team teammate Christine Colombo Nilsen, would be joining Olympique Lyonnais of the Division 1 Féminine. She made her debut for the club on 8 November 2009 coming on as a substitute in a 6–1 victory over Juvisy. Herlovsen scored her first goal for the club on 7 March 2010 scoring a brace in a 9–0 victory over Muret in the Challenge de France. She later featured in the final match of the UEFA Women's Champions League in 2010.

In February 2017, Herlovsen signed a contract with the Chinese club Jiangsu Suning, at the same time taking a break from playing for the Norwegian national team. In her Chinese debut match she scored a goal.

In 2018, Herlovsen returned to Norway to join Våleranga, then she was loaned out to her former club Kolbotn in 2019. In 2020, she and her club Våleranga agreed to terminate her contract.

She made a brief comeback in 2021 for Fredrikstad FK, to secure promotion to the Second Division.

International career
Herlovsen had her first appearance for the Norwegian national team at the age of 16. In her first major tournament, Herlovsen was the youngest player at the competition. She scored two goals; one against France in the group stage and another against Sweden in the semi-finals. Norway won the match 3–2, but lost 3–1 in the final to Germany.

At the 2007 FIFA Women's World Cup in China, Herlovsen scored one goal in the group stage against Ghana. In the quarter-finals she scored the game-winning goal in Norway's 1–0 victory over the hosts, thus eliminating China from the tournament, in front of 50,000 spectators. In the semi-finals, Norway again lost to Germany. On 9 June 2008, Herlovsen was named to the national team squad to play in the women's tournament at the 2008 Summer Olympics.

In August 2009, Herlovsen was selected for the Norway team that had qualified for the UEFA Women's Euro 2009 in Finland. With a steady place in the team for the first time, as a striker, she played all matches and won praise for her energetic and accurate play even at times as the team's single front runner. Norway beat Sweden unexpectedly in the quarter finals only to lose to the champions Germany in the semifinal in which Herlovsen scored Norway's only goal.

Personal life
Herlovsen's home is in Fredrikstad. Her father is Kai Erik Herlovsen, a former Norwegian international footballer who also played professionally in Germany for Borussia Mönchengladbach. Isabell has an older sister and a younger brother. In July 2011, Herlovsen came out as a lesbian, having been out to friends and family while in her teens. She has a son with her partner Christine Porsmyr Olsen.

Career statistics

International goals

Honours

Club
Kolbotn
 Toppserien: 2005, 2006
 Norwegian Cup: 2007

Lyon
 Division 1 Féminine: 2009–10
 Champions League runners-up: 2010

LSK Kvinner
 Toppserien: 2012, 2014, 2015, 2016
 Norwegian Cup: 2014, 2015, 2016

Jiangsu Suning
 Chinese Women's FA Cup: 2017

Individual
 Top Scorer, Toppserien: 2012 (25 goals), 2016 (30 goals)

References

External links

NFF profile 

1988 births
Living people
2007 FIFA Women's World Cup players
2011 FIFA Women's World Cup players
2015 FIFA Women's World Cup players
Footballers at the 2008 Summer Olympics
Norwegian LGBT sportspeople
Norway women's youth international footballers
Norway women's international footballers
Norwegian expatriate sportspeople in Germany
Norwegian women's footballers
Olympic footballers of Norway
Olympique Lyonnais Féminin players
Lesbian sportswomen
LGBT association football players
Norwegian expatriate women's footballers
Norwegian expatriate sportspeople in France
Expatriate women's footballers in France
Toppserien players
Kolbotn Fotball players
LSK Kvinner FK players
Vålerenga Fotball Damer players
Fredrikstad FK players
Sportspeople from Mönchengladbach
FIFA Century Club
Women's association football forwards
Norwegian expatriate sportspeople in China
Expatriate women's footballers in China
Division 1 Féminine players

2019 FIFA Women's World Cup players
Sportspeople from Fredrikstad